Gunnera mexicana,  is a species of Gunnera found in Vera Cruz, Mexico.

References

External links
 
 

mexicana